This is a list of events that will take place in Asia in 2023.

Events

 13 January - 29 January - 2023 Men's FIH Hockey World Cup

Scheduled and predicted events
 5 May – A penumbral lunar eclipse will be visible in the evening and the following morning in Africa, Asia and Australia and will be the 24th lunar eclipse of Lunar Saros 141.
 20 May – 11 June – 2023 FIFA U-20 World Cup in Indonesia.
 16 June – 16 July 16 – 2023 AFC Asian Cup.
 18 June – 2023 Turkish general election.
 23 September – 8 October – 2022 Asian Games in Hangzhou, Zhejiang, China.
 October – 26 November – 2023 Cricket World Cup in India.
 28 October – A partial lunar eclipse will be visible in the evening and the next morning over Europe and most of Africa and Asia and will be the 11th lunar eclipse of Lunar Saros 146.

References

 
Years of the 21st century in Asia
2020s in Asia